The mayor of Lipa is the head of the local government of Lipa in Batangas who elected to three year terms. The Mayor is also the executive head and leads the city's departments in executing the city ordinances and improving public services. The city mayor is restricted to three consecutive terms, totaling nine years, although a mayor can be elected again after an interruption of one term.

Eric Africa is the incumbent mayor of the city since June 2019.

List of mayors of Lipa

References

Batangas
Lipa, Batangas
Lipa